La Crouzille is a commune in the Puy-de-Dôme department of Auvergne-Rhône-Alpes, in central France.

See also
Communes of the Puy-de-Dôme department

References

Crouzille